A diener is a morgue worker responsible for handling, moving, and cleaning the corpse. In the UK, the equivalent job title is 'Mortuary Assistant', whilst the preparation, evisceration and reconstruction of the deceased is performed by an Anatomical Pathology Technician. In the US, Dieners are also referred to as "mortuary assistants" or "autopsy technicians". The word is derived from the German word Leichendiener, which literally means corpse servant ("Diener" means servant.).

A diener performs a number of tasks in medical schools and morgues. Helping a pathologist with examining and reconstructing cadavers are main tasks performed by a diener. A diener assists a pathologist or physician during an autopsy completing tasks such as handling tools and supplies, preparation of the deceased before and after autopsy. 
In addition to physical work with a pathologist and cadavers, dieners do work such as record keeping of identification and documentation of deceased in the form of items such as death certificates.

In the American Moravian Church (German: Herrnhuter Brüdergemeine), the men and (particularly) the women who assist in church services (like the Lovefeast) are called "Dieners", from the German title for their office, Saaldiener or "chapel servant".

Education 
Education requirements for a diener includes a high school diploma or a GED certificate. Requirements also include completion of one year of undergraduate coursework composed of at least six semester hours in courses including biology, human anatomy, physiology, zoology, or criminal justice with laboratory work as well. Becoming a diener includes experience working as a laboratory assistant which involved use of surgical tools or human anatomy knowledge, instead of any undergraduate course work. Dieners can use their work experience to pursue a degree in similar fields such as forensics, clinical laboratory work, and law enforcement.

Training 
In the beginning stages of working as a diener, there are training requirements. Formal training requirements for a diener includes manual handling, infection control, and safety procedures. The training has two parts: Taught Units and Workplace Competency.

The first portion, Taught Units, consists of five sections.
Human Anatomy and Physiology for Anatomical Pathology Technicians
Governance and Administration of Mortuary Practices
Health and Safety in the Mortuary
 Microbiology and Infection Control for Anatomical Pathology Technicians
Principles of Effective Communication for Anatomical Pathology Technicians

The second portion of formal training, Workplace Competency, consists of five sections as well.
Assist with Post Mortem Examinations
Preparation and Operation of a Mortuary
Prepare for Post Mortem Examinations
Team Working
Viewing of the Deceased

In addition to formal training, dieners learn how to do basic tasks through shadowing a mentor.

Skills 
Skills a diener needs includes physical strength, reasoning, problem solving, attention to detail, and stress tolerance. In addition to the above skills, integrity/honesty, visual identification, flexibility, and reading are other important skills a diener should possess.

Another skill is the ability to work with human remains, diagnostic tools, and surgical instruments involved in a death investigation. A diener is required to be knowledgeable of lab and safety techniques including the collection and preservation of evidence and any tasks involving any chemical, biological, microbiological, pathogenic and miscellaneous hazards.

Places of employment 
A diener can work in areas that include hospital mortuaries morgues and medical schools. When working in a medical school, a diener helps train medical students, interns, and residents on performing an autopsy. Dieners help train medical students, interns, and residents in autopsy techniques and procedures.

Duties 
The multiple duties of a diener are typically the same wherever employed.

One of the main duties is to assist in autopsies. One duty in assisting with autopsies includes positioning patients for them to be fingerprinted. Another task done as a part of assisting with autopsies involves the removal of organs, tissues, and any fluids (such as blood) from the body. Fingerprinting patients, removing tissues and organs, drawing and spinning blood samples are done as a part of collecting and preserving forensic evidence, which is a portion of the responsibilities for a diener. In autopsy assisting, a diener can collect and keep record of evidence relating to a patient’s death. Examples of collectible evidence includes any body tissues, slides, radiographs, and any on-scene evidence. A diener also performs tasks such as x-rays (body and dental) and developing and evaluating films from x-rays as a part of record keeping. The record keeping of evidence examined in an autopsy by a diener is used in the determination of the cause of death.

In addition to evidence collection and record keeping, a diener has the task of explaining the process of an autopsy in entirety to other employees, law enforcement, and others interested, such as family members of the dead.

A diener performs tasks such as checking inventory and placing orders for equipment and supplies regularly. In addition to performing inventory-related tasks, a diener will clean radiological and medical equipment, as well as inspecting equipment for any issues.

Hazards 
There are hazards involved with being a diener. There are approximately six types of hazards that a diener is at risk for: mechanical, sharp force, electrical, chemical, radiation, and infection.

Mechanical hazards categorize harm such as back injury from activity such as transporting cadavers. Sharp force hazards categorize any bodily harm from the use of tools and equipment such as scalpels and needles which resulting in cuts or punctures. Electrical hazards encompass any potential harm in the form of shock from the use of equipment like saws or defibrillators. Chemical hazards include harm from the use of a variety of chemicals used in the autopsy process such as cyanide and formaldehyde. Radiation hazards are related to any exposure from performing x-rays. Infection hazards are due to the potential that a cadaver is infected with a communicable disease.

Promotion opportunities 
A diener can be promoted to positions in the mortuary and forensic areas of practice. Dieners can advance to positions (such as a forensic morgue technician) and perform tasks of greater complexity and mainly works with a forensic pathologist, over a general pathologist. Dieners can be promoted to supervisory positions based upon the gaining of supervisory and administrative skills.

Salary 
The salary for a diener varies based upon education, experience, employer, and employment location (i.e., city or state of employment). The salary is typically between $25,000 and $38,000 annually.

References

Persons involved with death and dying
Traditions of the Moravian Church